The 2018 Worcester City Council election took place on 3 May 2018 to elect 35 Councillors to the Worcester City Council in England. This was on the same day as other local elections.

Council Composition

After the election

Results

Battenhall

Bedwardine

Cathedral

Claines

Gorse Hill

Nunnery

Rainbow Hill

St John

St Peter's Parish

Warndon

Warndon Parish North

Warndon Parish South

By-Elections held since 2018

Claines

References

2018 English local elections
2018
2010s in Worcestershire